The Sacred Sites in Mecca are ritually important sites in Mecca that were mentioned in the Quran and are visited by pilgrims during the annual Hajj. These sites are Mina, Arafat, and Muzdalifah.

Mina 

It is a valley surrounded by mountains and is considered one of the sacred sites situated 6 km to the east of the city of Mecca. It is a remarkable site due to its role that it plays during Hajj, where pilgrims spend most of their time in Mina. It contains the three stone pillars (Jamarat).

Arafat 

Arafat is a hill situated about 20 km east of central Mecca. It is a crucial site to Muslim pilgrims who have to go to Arafat on the 9th of the month of Dhu al-Hijjah.

Muzdalifah 

Muzdalifah, the third sacred site, near to Mecca and southeast of Mina located between Mina and Arafat.

See also 
 List of religious sites
 Sacred site

References 

Neighborhoods of Mecca
Hajj